Ctenochaetus truncatus is a tropical fish found in the Indian Ocean. It was first named by Randall and Clements in 2001, and is known commonly as the Indian gold-ring bristletooth.

References

External links
 

Acanthuridae
Fish described in 2001